This is a discography of works by Mike Portnoy. For information about recordings made by Dream Theater see Dream Theater discography.

Albums discography

Instructional DVD releases 
Portnoy has released several instructional drumming videos/DVDs.  These include:
 "Progressive Drum Concepts" (Rittor Music 1996 1 VHS/DVD)
 "Liquid Drum Theater" (Hudson Music 2000 2 DVDs)
 "In Constant Motion" (Hudson Music 2007, 3 DVDs)

Portnoy's self filmed performances 
Portnoy has self-released "drum-cam" DVDs and digital downloads of the last several Dream Theater and side project recording sessions as well as various live performances through his own "MP4" production company which can be found on his website.  These are "in-studio" with some live recordings typically consisting of Full Band, Isolated Drums tracks, and an Audio Commentary.
 "Asian Clinic Tour" (MP4 Productions 2001, 1 DVD)
 "Ten Degrees of Turbulent Drumming" (MP4 Productions 2002, 1 DVD)
 "Drums Across Forever" (MP4 Productions 2002, 1 DVD)
 "Hammer of the Gods" (MP4 Productions 2003, 1 DVD)
 "Yellow Matter Custard – One Night in New York City" (MP4 Productions 2003, 1 DVD)
 "Drums of Thought" (MP4 Productions 2004, 1 DVD)
 "Live at Budokan" (MP4 Production 2005, 1 DVD)
 "Mike Portnoy – Drumavarium" (MP4 Productions 2005, 1 DVD) "Amazing Journey – One Night in New York City" (MP4 Productions 2005, 1 DVD) "Cygnus and the Sea Monsters – One Night in Chicago" (MP4 Productions 2005, 1 DVD) "sysDRUMatic chaos" (MP4 Productions 2007, 1 DVD) "SCORE" (MP4 Productions 2008, 1 DVD) "Black Clouds & Silver Drumming" (MP4 Productions 2009, 1 DVD) "Whirlwind Drumming" (MP4 Productions 2010, 1 DVD)  "Yellow Matter Custard – One More Night in New York City" (MP4 Productions 2011, 1 DVD)  "Testimony 2:Live Drum Cam" (MP4 Productions 2012, 1 DVD) "Drumertá" (MP4 Productions 2012, 1 DVD)  "Drumming Colors" (MP4 Productions 2012, 1 DVD)  "Live Momentum" (MP4 Productions 2013, 1 DVD)  "The Drumming Dog" (MP4 Productions 2013, 1 DVD) "Kaleidodrums" (MP4 Productions 2014, 1 DVD) "Drumming Nature" (MP4 Productions 2014, 1 DVD) "Hot Drums" (MP4 Productions 2015, 1 DVD) "Metal Drumming" (MP4 Productions 2015, 1 DVD) "The Similitude of a Dream Live" (MP4 Productions 2017, 1 DVD) "The Great Adventure" (MP4 Productions 2019, 1 DVD) "Third Degree" (MP4 Productions 2019, 1 DVD) "MPMMXX" (MP4 Productions 2020, 1 DVD) "The Absolute Universe" (MP4 Productions 2021, 1 DVD) "LTE 3" (MP4 Productions 2021, 1 DVD) Awards and recognition 
Modern Drummer

Mike Portnoy won the following Modern Drummer magazine Reader's Poll awards:
 Best Up & Coming Talent (1994)
 Best Progressive Rock Drummer (1995–2006)
 Best Recorded Performance (1995 for Awake, 1996 for A Change of Seasons, 1998 for Falling Into Infinity, 2000 for Metropolis Pt. 2: Scenes From a Memory, 2002 for Six Degrees of Inner Turbulence, 2007 for Score) and 2011 for Nightmare (Avenged Sevenfold).
 Best Clinician (2000, 2002)
 Best Educational Video/DVD (2000, 2002)
 Hall of Fame Inductee (2004) 
 Best Rock Drummer (2015)

He has released three instructional videos, "Progressive Drum Concepts", "Liquid Drum Theater", which has won awards from Modern Drummer Magazine, and his latest "In Constant Motion". He has released many "Official Bootlegs" on his website, including footage of the studio sessions for the Dream Theater albums Six Degrees of Inner Turbulence, Train of Thought, Octavarium and the Transatlantic release Bridge Across Forever. He has released bootlegs of his tribute bands Hammer of the Gods (a Led Zeppelin tribute), Yellow Matter Custard (The Beatles), Cygnus and the Sea Monsters (Rush), and Amazing Journey (The Who).

In the October 2009 issue of Rhythm Magazine, Portnoy was listed as #5 in their list of the Top 50 Drummers of All Time.

He was featured on Fuse TV's Talking Metal where he joined with Bobby Ellsworth and the show's hosts in covering Motörhead's "Overkill."

On June 14, 2010, Mike Portnoy won the Metal Hammer Golden God Award for Best Drummer.

As voted on by 6,500 drummers worldwide, Portnoy won the Drummies Award for Best Progressive Rock drummer in 2010, while Joey Jordison of Slipknot/Rob Zombie/Murderdolls won the award for Best Metal drummer.

At the Revolver Golden God Awards on April 20, 2011, he won the "Best Drummer Award" for his work with Avenged Sevenfold.

On June 7, 2011, Portnoy posted on his Facebook that he had won Drum!'' magazine's "Drummer of the Year Award" and the "Metal Drummer Award".

Portnoy won the "Virtuoso" award at the 2013 Progressive Music Awards.

References 

Alternative rock discographies
Discographies of American artists